The 1899–1900 Northern Football League season was the eleventh in the history of the Northern Football League, a football competition in Northern England.

Division One

The division featured 7 clubs which competed in the last season, along with two new clubs, promoted from last seasons's Division Two: 
 Stockton St. John's
 Thornaby Utopians

League table

Division Two

The division featured 7 clubs which competed in the last season, along with three new clubs:
 Dorman, Long & Co.
 Grangetown Athletic
 Whitby

League table

References

1899-1900
1899–1900 in English association football leagues